Divas in Distress is a 2012 Hong Kong television drama produced by TVB. Written by Chan Kam-ling and produced by Poon Ka-tak, Divas in Distress is a sister production of the time traveling comedy, A Chip Off the Old Block.

Plot

In the past (approximately the 50s-60s) Fung Hun Man (Chung King-fai) was a famous writer, producer, and actor in the early days of Hong Kong cinema. During his youth, he adopted two girls and had them become sisters-in-training: Sheung Ying Hung (Liza Wang) and Miu Sing Ho (Gigi Wong). Both girls were groomed into the path of becoming actresses and the two maintained a lifetime rivalry over each other's successes both on and off the stage. At the height of their careers, Miu Sing Ho suffered a severe auto accident that affected her ability to walk. Due to her disability, she was unable to continue acting and was forced to retire; she was looked over and Sheung Ying Hung took her place, rose to the top of stardom, and became very successful. Distraught, angry, and unable to accept her fate, Miu Sing Ho transferred much of her frustrations over her "sister", Sheung Ying Hung, and blamed her for taking away her success and fame.

In between this time and unknown to the girls, their master, Fung Hun Man, developed a secret romantic relationship with a budding actress, Ching Yeuk Chan (Mimi Choo). While they kept their relationship a secret, Ching Yeuk Chan steadily grew tired of their secret relationship. One day, Ching Yeuk Chan discovered she was pregnant, but after overhearing the conservative and non-supportive chatter of her lover amongst other men, she realized he couldn't be relied on and decided to run off with a rich man. Before running off, she gave birth to a son, So Kei (Koo Ming Wah), and gave away the boy to Sheung Ying Hung's lifetime personal assistant, Deneuve So Lo Wah (So Yan Chi), and So Kei would end up growing up under Sheung Ying Hung's family for the latter of their lives and Vincent's best friend.

Time had passed, but their rivalry continued even after getting married and having children. Sheung Ying Hung had two kids, Chak Ding Yum (older sister) and Vincent Chak Yau Sing (Him Law); her husband is not known. Sheung Ying Hung's husband went missing on a trip and was presumed dead after being missing for many years; she raised her kids along with So Kei (who grew up to be very metro-sexual, straight, but thought to be gay by many) for most of their lives. Miu Sing Ho eventually married a house renovator, Chong Kan Sau (Henry Lee) and had a son, Chong Ka Long, aka "Yi Long San", (Chin Kar-lok). Their worlds would collide again when Chak Ding Yum and Yi Long San (both reporters) would become romantically involved.

Sheung Ying Hung didn't respect Yi Long San: she saw him as a poor match for her daughter, but the couple refused to listen and decided to marry with or without Sheung Ying Hung's permission. Out of pride, Sheung Ying Hung refused to attend the couple's marriage and ignored the couple until Ding Yum died. Ding Yum had a heart condition that she kept from everyone. She wanted to grant Yi Long San's wish of having a child together, which cost her life. Sheung Ying Hung would blame Yi Long San for Dim Yum's death for many years to come, but the one redeeming thing they could salvage out of this tragedy was the child, Michel Chong Man Sai (Tong Chi Fai).

The story actually begins with both sides of the family actively competing for custody over Michel. On top of their long term rivalry, Sheung Ying Hung and Miu Sing Ho actively fight for the attention and future of their mutual grandson. Yi Long San is often trapped in the middle: he is often subjected to great difficulties in maintaining peace between both his mother and mother-in-law as well as maintaining a relationship with his son without the intervention of the overbearing Sheung Ying Hung. In between the bickering and the health scares with Michel (often causing Sheung Ying Hung to tighten her control over Michel), two situations began to develop: the budding romances between Hannah (Eliza Sam) and Yi Long San and between Kwai Yi Hei and Vincent.

Vincent is a well-established designer and CEO of his own company because of the backing of his mother. When he assigns Kwai Yi Hei (Yi Long San's cousin, played by Mandy Wong) to renovate one of his open office areas, he is disgusted by her smell and tomboyish looks, but things that later change when he falls in love with her abilities. Kwai Yi Hei is also a talented spray paint artist and Vincent unknowingly falls in love with the Banksy-style HK art that she did while he searches for meaningful art. Only after learning the truth that Kwai Yi Hei is the actual artist does he begin to develop strong feelings for her and begin using strong-arm tactics to extend the length of the renovation project in order to spend more time with her. After a series of fights with Vincent, So Kei quietly explains to Kwai Yi Hei that Vincent cares about her and that he has risked his health (as he is a sensitive asthmatic) and career for the sake of her. Eventually, the two finally recognize each other's feelings and begin secretly seeing each other, but not without the ire of Vincent's mother.

Sheung Ying Hung self-righteously believes that Kwai Yi Hei is a lower-class person who is not worthy of Vincent; she also believes Hannah isn't worthy of Yi Long San as a replacement for Ding Sum. Because of Sheung Ying Hung's disapproval of both relationships, this creates a rift in the pair's own relationship. Yi Long San maintains a platonic relationship, but there are obvious signs he cares for Hannah and Kwai Yi Hei constantly shows hesitation in moving their relationship forward.

Meanwhile, Yi Long San (a news reporter and cameraman) had a rough encounter with Hannah (daughter of Ching Yeuk Chan and So Kei's younger half-sister). Although Hannah is heir to a vast fortune, she wishes to be a reporter and starts an investigation about Sheung Ying Hung and Miu Sing Ho, wanting to uncover the dark secrets of the duo in their glory days and also digs up gossip to attract ratings. However, her quest nearly accidentally costs the life of Michel and Hannah eventually drops the investigation. However, she ends up working together with Yi Long San as a reporter-cameraman duo and starts to get closer. As the two get closer, Sheung Ying Hung took notice of Yi Long San's potential love interest and even though she always claimed he was never worthy of her daughter, she made him swear that he would be eternally loyal to her dead daughter. However, even though he maintains a platonic and professional relationship with Hannah, Yi Long San's actions prove he cares for Hannah more than just a friend.

Ultimately, this causes pain and suffering for everyone and Sheung Ying Hung eventually learned by eavesdropping that she is not liked for her past decisions, including the fact that her daughter might have lived if she was not so elitist and so controlling over her decisions. Feeling hurt and insulted, she makes an excuse to go off on a trip, but secretly stays at a Buddhist monastery to sort things out; in combination of learning the wisdom from the Buddhist monks and finally attaining self-awareness of the negative consequences of her actions, she suffers from great stress both mentally and physically and becomes physically and mentally ill. By chance, Kwai Yi Hei is also at the monastery, doing probation work after a mishap with the law. Seeing how Vincent's mother was suffering, she contacts Vincent in the hope that he will take Sheung Ying Hung home. However, Vincent's mother is being stubborn over the matter and he lets her off to her own devices until she ended up in the hospital and eventually returned home.

While this is happening, Vincent takes the chance to try to win Kwai Yi Hei's heart, but she remains distant. After getting in trouble with the probationary officer for submitting an improper journal entry, Vincent discovered Kwai Yi Hei has a disability affecting her literacy; she relies on her personal “picture code” system to convey her thoughts on paper. To understand more, Vincent looks for Kwai Yi Hei's uncle for answers and learns that Kwai Yi Hei used to be very rebellious and dated a troublesome boyfriend. When he committed a crime, he convinced Kwai Yi Hei to take the fall and promised to marry her after she's released; she believed in her boyfriend and heartedly agreed to take the fall. Sadly, she ultimately found out she was tricked as her boyfriend broke up with her and found someone else while she was in jail.

The sobering experience straightened her out as a person, but due to a combination of her low self-esteem and poor literacy skills, she developed a fear of commitment as she feels that she will eventually be abandoned due to her problems. However, Vincent vows to prove his loyalty and devotion to her and eventually wins her heart again. After helping her win a trip to Japan in a lottery, he strong-arms his way to make sure he and Kwai Yi Hei will be on the same trip. On this trip Vincent proposes to her; she at first refuses, but Vincent eventually wins her acceptance.

Meanwhile, Ching Yeuk Chan has returned to Hong Kong to visit Hannah. However, her sudden return makes Deneuve nervous. Deneuve thinks Ching Yeuk Chan had come back for So Kei, but Ching Yeuk Chan makes it clear she returned to visit her daughter, not her long lost son. However, So Kei and Ching Yeuk Chan have already encountered each without knowledge of their actual relationship and grow close. So Kei eventually learns of his true parentage and the two develop a friendly relationship. However, Ching Yeuk Chan still holds a grudge against Fung Hun Man and kept both him and her son out of the loop of each other's identities.

Fung Hun Man discovers Ching Yeuk Chan's return. Both miss each other, but due to past misunderstandings relating to their separation, there is both love and anger on both sides. It is only later when they heatedly argue about each other's past actions that it is revealed she had their child. Eventually, Fung Hun Man figures out it was So Kei and the three temporarily accept each other, until So Kei develops a relationship with Yi Long San's boss, a ruthless tomboy chief editor. This forms a rift as Fung Hun Man feels that it is shameful for his son to love a “man”, but So Kei eventually learns to understand his father and they maintain a mutually respectful relationship since.

Through this, Hannah learns about So Kei and their relationship. While she was quick to accept So Kei, she has difficulty accepting her mother was a gold digger who married for financial security. Although Ching Yeuk Chan admits she married for money first, she explained she learned to love her husband. Although she becomes cold towards her mother, Hannah eventually learns to forgive her. However, Hannah's greatest challenge is with Yi Long San.

Yi Long San maintained a weak platonic relationship with Hannah. After Hannah gets into a car accident, Yi Long San admits at his wife's grave that he has been unfaithful as he has feelings for Hannah. After Hannah recovers, she pretends to have lost her memories and even develops an aggressive personality to make it easier for Yi Long San to realize it's better to move away. However, Yi Long San realizes that they care for each other, but Hannah points out he's unwilling to move on due to his dead wife. The final straw for Hannah is when Yi Long San removes her audio cord during a live report. She felt Yi Long San is not supportive and constantly puts her aside when necessary. Tired of this repetitive cycle, she decides to quit the job and transfer elsewhere as the situation saddens her too much.

In the end of the story, everything ends at a happy climax. Vincent was hiding the fact that Kwai Yi Hei's job (use of paints, chemicals, and plasters that ends up on her clothes) has made his health worse and she only found out later through So Kei. After hearing from So Kei that because of her work had caused Vincent health to decline, Hei decided to retire from carpentry and be a housewife for the sake of their love, but Vincent tried to leave their engagement because he doesn't want Hei to be sad in the future by insulting her and making her wearing a dress and shoes to the award ceremony. So Kei then arrived to Hei's uncle shop and tells Hei that vincent has gone to the airport, which makes Hei understand that Vincent done all these stuff to make her happy, so she doesn't have to give up her job as a construction worker. Then, Yi Long San took Hei to stop Vincent from going to the airport. Hei then ask Vincent why he always make his own decision and why she can't do something for him. Vincent tells Hei that saying she is stupid is right because she doesn't understand what make him love Hei so much. Vincent loves Hei the way she is because her hand is rough, her clothing are so dirty, and she is always wearing that dirty hat and how she is so stubborn. Vincent tells Hei that if she doesn't have these qualities she would just me a regular housewife and whats the point of marrying her. Hei then explains to Vincent that she has no choice because of his health even through normal contact he already this sick if she still work as a construction worker she is scared that he will be very sick one day. Also she tells Vincent that he is breaking his promise because he promised her that he will take her to the tower in Japan and will help her write her name. Vincent then tells Hei that of he not her life it's not too much of a problem because when he ask her to marry her she said she has to wait after Doomsday and that he is the one that make Hei to be with him. So, Vincent suggests that they should just break up. As Vincent walks to his car Hei goes to the front and hugs him and put his arm on her waist. Vincent lets go every time and the third time that Hei puts his hands on her waist and he holds on tight because he knows that both Hei and him don't want to lose each other because they still love each other. Both of them are happy, and Vincent kisses Hei on the forehead and they hugged each other again. Hannah's absence has made Yi Long San realized how much he misses her and after she randomly returned for a news report, covering the 2012 Apocalypse, Yi Long San made it clear he wants to be with her and the two became a cameraman-reporter couple. So Kei and Yi Long San's boss remains together, happily dancing and enjoying their reverse-gender role relationship. Vincent and Hei are finally engaged and Vincent took her to see pretty skyscrapers that lights up in Hong Kong in the nighttime. Fung Hun Man and Ching Yeuk Chan reunited as a couple after all these years and his lifelong rivaling students found mutual peace with Michel. Sheung Ying Hung realized the error of her ways and no longer opposed Vincent's relationship with Kwai Yi Hei as she feared she might lose her only son like how she lost her daughter; everyone found peace and balance with each other.

Cast and characters

Hung's Household

Ho's Household

F4 Brothers

LCD News Department

Other

Production
Development for Divas in Distress began in January 2010. Intentionally planned to be a sequel of TVB's popular time traveling comedy, A Chip Off the Old Block, Poon Ka-tak decided to reboot the entire series after scheduling conflicts did not work out with the original cast. After casting Liza Wang in January 2012, Gigi Wong, Chin Kar-lok, Chung King-fai, Mandy Wong and Him Law followed in February 2012. Liza Wang and Gigi Wong's last collaboration was in 1976's The Legend of the Book and the Sword.

Principal photography began in late March. On 23 March 2012, the cast attended a costume fitting press conference. A blessing ceremony was held on 8 May. Filming completely in mid-June 2012.

Viewership ratings
The following is a table that includes a list of the total ratings points based on television viewership.

International Broadcast
  - 8TV (Malaysia)

References

External links
 Official TVB website

TVB dramas
2012 Hong Kong television series debuts
2012 Hong Kong television series endings